Popowia beddomeana is a species of plant in the Annonaceae family. It is native to Kerala and Tamil Nadu in India.

References

beddomeana
Flora of Kerala
Flora of Tamil Nadu
Endangered plants
Taxonomy articles created by Polbot